Bulqizë District was one of the 36 districts of Albania, which were dissolved in July 2000 and replaced by 12 counties. Located in the east of the country, its capital was the town of Bulqizë.

Administrative divisions
The district consisted of the following municipalities:

Bulqizë
Fushë-Bulqizë
Gjoricë
Martanesh
Ostren
Shupenzë
Trebisht
Zerqan

Note: - urban municipalities in bold

References

Districts of Albania
Geography of Dibër County